Micropholis polita is a species of plant in the family Sapotaceae. It is endemic to Cuba, but threatened by habitat loss.

Two subspecies have been named:
 Micropholis polita subsp. hotteana Judd
 Micropholis polita subsp. polita

References

polita
Flora of Cuba
Vulnerable plants
Taxonomy articles created by Polbot